The 1790 Pennsylvania gubernatorial election was the first gubernatorial election after the establishment of the Commonwealth of Pennsylvania as a U.S. state. Thomas Mifflin, the incumbent President of the Supreme Executive Council of the Commonwealth of Pennsylvania was elected as the first Governor of Pennsylvania. He defeated Federalist candidate Arthur St. Clair, former Revolutionary War general and President of the Continental Congress, by a wide margin.

Results

References

1790
Gubernatorial
Pennsylvania